Maja Visens  is a mountain in northern Albania in the Accursed Mountains range. It is about 6 km southeast from the village-Nikç. Maja Visens is located in the Radohimës Mountain area in the west range.

References

External links
Summitpost, Maja Radohines

Mountains of Albania
Accursed Mountains